Daniel Cáceres Silva (born April 3, 1982) is a Paraguayan association football Midfielder currently playing for Barracas Central of the Primera B Metropolitana in Argentina.

Teams
  San Lorenzo (Inferiors) 2000-2001
  Almagro 2001-2002
  San Lorenzo 2003
  Deportivo Morón 2003-2004
  Deportivo Laferrere 2004–2006
  Barracas Central 2006–present

References
 
 

1982 births
Living people
Paraguayan footballers
Paraguayan expatriate footballers
San Lorenzo de Almagro footballers
Club Almagro players
Deportivo Morón footballers
Argentine Primera División players
Expatriate footballers in Argentina
Paraguayan expatriate sportspeople in Argentina
Sportspeople from Asunción
Association football midfielders